In finance, a foreign exchange option (commonly shortened to just FX option or currency option) is a derivative financial instrument that gives the right but not the obligation to exchange money denominated in one currency into another currency at a pre-agreed exchange rate on a specified date. See Foreign exchange derivative.

The foreign exchange options market is the deepest, largest and most liquid market for options of any kind. Most trading is over the counter (OTC) and is lightly regulated, but a fraction is traded on exchanges like the International Securities Exchange, Philadelphia Stock Exchange, or the Chicago Mercantile Exchange for options on futures contracts. The global market for exchange-traded currency options was notionally valued by the Bank for International Settlements at $158.3 trillion in 2005.

Example
For example, a GBPUSD
contract could give the owner the right to sell £1,000,000 and buy $2,000,000 on December 31. In this case the pre-agreed exchange rate, or strike price, is 2.0000 USD per GBP (or GBP/USD 2.00 as it is typically quoted) and the notional amounts (notionals) are £1,000,000 and $2,000,000.

This type of contract is both a call on dollars and a put on sterling, and is typically called a GBPUSD put, as it is a put on the exchange rate; although it could equally be called a USDGBP call.

If the rate is lower than 2.0000 on December 31 (say 1.9000), meaning that the dollar is stronger and the pound is weaker, then the option is exercised, allowing the owner to sell GBP at 2.0000 and immediately buy it back in the spot market at 1.9000, making a profit of (2.0000 GBPUSD − 1.9000 GBPUSD) × 1,000,000 GBP = 100,000 USD in the process. If instead they take the profit in GBP (by selling the USD on the spot market) this amounts to 100,000 / 1.9000 = 52,632 GBP.

Terms
 Call option – the right to buy an asset at a fixed date and price.
 Put option – the right to sell an asset at a fixed date and price.
 Foreign exchange option – the right to sell money in one currency and buy money in another currency at a fixed date and rate.
 Strike price – the asset price at which the investor can exercise an option.
 Spot price – the price of the asset at the time of the trade.
 Forward price – the price of the asset for delivery at a future time.
 Notional – the amount of each currency that the option allows the investor to sell or buy.
 Ratio of notionals – the strike, not the current spot or forward.
 Numéraire – the currency in which an asset is valued.
 Non-linear payoff – the payoff for a straightforward FX option is linear in the underlying currency, denominating the payout in a given numéraire.
 In the money – for a put option, this is when the current price is less than the strike price, and would thus generate a profit were it exercised; for a call option the situation is inverted.

Trading
The difference between FX options and traditional options is that in the latter case the trade is to give an amount of money and receive the right to buy or sell a commodity, stock or other non-money asset. In FX options, the asset in question is also money, denominated in another currency.

For example, a call option on oil allows the investor to buy oil at a given price and date. The investor on the other side of the trade is in effect selling a put option on the currency.

To eliminate residual risk, traders match the foreign currency notionals, not the local currency notionals, else the foreign currencies received and delivered do not offset.

In the case of an FX option on a rate, as in the above example, an option on GBPUSD gives a USD value that is linear in GBPUSD using USD as the numéraire (a move from 2.0000 to 1.9000 yields a  profit), but has a non-linear GBP value. Conversely, the GBP value is linear in the USDGBP rate, while the USD value is non-linear.

Hedging
Corporations primarily use FX options to hedge uncertain future cash flows in a foreign currency. The general rule is to hedge certain foreign currency cash flows with forwards, and uncertain foreign cash flows with options.

Suppose a United Kingdom manufacturing firm expects to be paid  for a piece of engineering equipment to be delivered in 90 days. This uncertainty exposes the firm to FX risk. This forward contract is free, and, presuming the expected cash arrives, exactly matches the firm's exposure, perfectly hedging their FX risk.

If the cash flow is uncertain, a forward FX contract exposes the firm to FX risk in the opposite direction, in the case that the expected USD cash is not received, typically making an option a better choice.

Using options, the UK firm can purchase a GBP call/USD put option (the right to sell part or all of their expected income for pounds sterling at a predetermined rate), which:
 protects the GBP value that the firm expects in 90 days' time (presuming the cash is received)
 costs at most the option premium (unlike a forward, which can have unlimited losses)
 yields a profit if the expected cash is not received but FX rates move in its favor

Valuation: the Garman–Kohlhagen model  
As in the Black–Scholes model for stock options and the Black model for certain interest rate options, the value of a European option on an FX rate is typically calculated by assuming that the rate follows a log-normal process.

The earliest currency options pricing model was published by Biger and Hull, (Financial Management, spring 1983). The model preceded the Garman and Kolhagen's Model. In 1983 Garman and Kohlhagen extended the Black–Scholes model to cope with the presence of two interest rates (one for each currency). The results are also in the same units and to be meaningful need to be converted into one of the currencies.

Then the domestic currency value of a call option into the foreign currency is

The value of a put option has value

where :

 is the current spot rate
 is the strike price
 is the cumulative normal distribution function
 is domestic risk free simple interest rate
 is foreign risk free simple interest rate
 is the time to maturity (calculated according to the appropriate day count convention)

Risk management
An earlier pricing model was published by Biger and Hull, Financial Management, spring 1983. The model preceded Garman and Kolhagen Model. 
A wide range of techniques are in use for calculating the options risk exposure, or Greeks (as for example the Vanna-Volga method). Although the option prices produced by every model agree (with Garman–Kohlhagen), risk numbers can vary significantly depending on the assumptions used for the properties of spot price movements, volatility surface and interest rate curves.

After Garman–Kohlhagen, the most common models are SABR and local volatility, although when agreeing risk numbers with a counterparty (e.g. for exchanging delta, or calculating the strike on a 25 delta option) Garman–Kohlhagen is always used.

References

Options (finance)
Derivatives (finance)